Hailuogou is a glacier located in Luding County, Garzê Tibetan Autonomous Prefecture, Sichuan, China. It is a feature of Hailuogou Glacier Forest Park. It is a 5A-level (AAAAA) tourist attraction in China. It is famous for its low-altitude modern glaciers, large ice waterfalls and alpine hot springs. The glacier originates from Mount Gongga.

History
In February 2017, the park was listed under the 5A-level tourist attractions list.

On September 5, 2022, a magnitude-6.8 earthquake struck Luding County, killing three park employees. An additional 219 visitors were trapped in the park for more than 50 hours before being rescued.

Glacier
The glacier covers a  area of Conch Gully and is characterized as a modern glacier, having formed 16 million years ago.

Tourist attractions
The park features several hot springs and "red rocks" which are rocks covered in red orange algae.

References

Glaciers of China
Garzê Tibetan Autonomous Prefecture
AAAAA-rated tourist attractions
Tourist attractions in Sichuan